Molly and Lawless John is a 1972 American Western film directed by Gary Nelson and starring Vera Miles and Sam Elliott. The film was nominated for a Golden Globe Award for Best Original Song in 1973.

Plot
Molly Parker (Vera Miles) is married to the sheriff of an American frontier town. She finds herself dangerously drawn to a condemned prisoner, Johnny Lawler (Sam Elliott), in her husband's jail. He perceives her restlessness, flatters her, and tells her of his unhappy childhood. That night Molly's husband threatens her and is scornful when she tries to talk to him about them having a baby. She breaks John out of jail and they ride off together.

She has fallen in love with him, but after they get away it becomes increasingly clear that he cares for her only as long as she can help him escape the posse pursuing him. He boasts to her about the lies he told to win her sympathy. When surprised by the posse he takes flight and abandons her, but she follows him and after they get away he explains his actions in a way she accepts.

While in hiding they come across a dying Indian woman with a newborn baby. John wants to get rid of the infant, saying they are already too short of food and water, but Molly insists that they look after the child. She leaves the baby with him while she goes into town for supplies, and he takes care of the baby affectionately while she is gone. The other reason for her going to town is to deliver a message to John's girlfriend, Dolly (Cynthia Myers). Molly brings her back to the hideout shack, and John and Dolly have a romantic reunion while Molly waits outside with the baby.

After the girlfriend leaves to make plans for her and John to escape to Mexico, Molly rides back into town with the baby. When she returns, the posse secretly follows her to their hideout. A shootout follows and John and Molly again escape, with the baby. Once they are safely away an angry John asks Molly how the posse knew to follow her. Under his insistent questioning she admits that while in town she had the baby baptized in John's name.

A livid John is about to take out his fury on the baby, but before he can do anything violent Molly shoots him. She drapes his dead body over a horse, and, with the baby, rides back to her husband's town. She tells the deputy who approaches her she claims the reward for having recaptured John, that he took her hostage when he escaped and held her captive until she was able to shoot him.

Cast
Vera Miles as Molly Parker
Sam Elliott as Johnny Lawler
Clu Gulager as Deputy Tom Clements
John Anderson as Sheriff Marvin Parker 
Cynthia Myers as Dolly Winward
baby at the end - Robert Krueger

See also
 List of American films of 1972

References

External links
 
 

1972 films
1972 Western (genre) films
American Western (genre) films
Films directed by Gary Nelson
Films scored by Johnny Mandel
1972 directorial debut films
1970s English-language films
1970s American films